Abarca was a Chilean village, located about  northwest of Melipilla, Chile. In 1899, it had 393 inhabitants.

It also had a Catholic Parish, constructed in 1873; a registry office; a post office; and a free school.

Every December 8, a religious holiday takes place in Abarca. Abarca is named after former owners of the area.

References

Populated places in Melipilla Province